CIK or Cik may refer to:

Organisations 
 CIK Telecom, a Canadian telecommunications company
 Caisse Interprofessionnelle de Dépôts et de Virements de Titres, a Belgian central securities depository acquired by Euroclear
 Confederazione Italiana Kendo, a Kendo Federation in Italy
 Commission Internationale de Karting, the primary international sanctioning body for Kart racing

Places 
 Čik, a river in northern Serbia
 Chalkyitsik Airport (IATA: CIK), an airport in Chalkyitsik, Alaska

Science and technology 
 Cytokine-induced killer cell, a subset of natural killer T cells
 Crypto Ignition Key, or KSD-64, a security token developed by the U.S. National Security Agency

Other uses 
 Central Index Key, a number assigned by the US Securities and Exchange Commission to identify financial filings
 Chiksana railway station (station code CIK), a railway station in Chak Baltikari, Uttar Pradesh, India